The Angel of Contention is a 1914 American short drama film directed by  John B. O'Brien and starring Lillian Gish.

Cast
 Spottiswoode Aitken
 Lillian Gish
 George Siegmann
 Raoul Walsh

See also
 List of American films of 1914
 Lillian Gish filmography

References

External links

1914 films
1914 short films
1914 drama films
American black-and-white films
American silent short films
Silent American drama films
Films directed by John B. O'Brien
1910s American films
American drama short films
1910s English-language films